Robert James Hanby (born 24 December 1974) is an English former footballer who played in the Football League for Scarborough.

References

English footballers
English Football League players
Barnsley F.C. players
Scarborough F.C. players
1974 births
Living people
Association football defenders